The 1962 PGA Championship was the 44th PGA Championship, played July 19–22 at Aronimink Golf Club in Newtown Square, Pennsylvania, a suburb west of Philadelphia. Gary Player won the first of his two PGA Championships, one stroke ahead of runner-up Bob Goalby, for the third of his nine major titles and the third leg of his career grand slam.

The Open Championship was played the previous week in Troon, Scotland, the first of five times in the 1960s that these two majors were played in consecutive weeks in July. The PGA Championship moved permanently to August in 1969 (except 1971, when it was played in late February).

Player missed the 36-hole cut at Troon, the British Open was won by Arnold Palmer for the second straight year. Palmer had also won the Masters in April. Both the U.S. Open and PGA Championship were played in his home state of Pennsylvania in 1962, just five weeks apart. Palmer lost to 22-year-old Jack Nicklaus in an 18-hole playoff at the U.S. Open at Oakmont near Pittsburgh, then finished ten strokes back in a tie for 17th at Aronimink.

Jack Nicklaus, age 22, shot a final round 67 to finish in a tie for third in his first PGA Championship.

This championship was originally scheduled for Brentwood Country Club in Los Angeles, the first in California since 1929. In November 1960, the PGA of America had voted to retain its "caucasian only" clause, and had gained the ire of California's attorney general Stanley Mosk, who threatened to shut down the PGA in the state until the clause was removed. In response, the championship for 1962 was moved from Los Angeles to Philadelphia. The PGA of America dropped the clause in November 1961 by amending its constitution. The championship returned to California in 1977 at Pebble Beach, but was not played in southern California until 1983 at Riviera.

Past champions in the field

Made both cuts

Missed the first cut

Source:

Round summaries

First round
Thursday, July 19, 1962

Source:

Second round
Friday, July 20, 1962

Source:

Third round
Saturday, July 21, 1962

Source:

Final leaderboard
Sunday, July 22, 1962

References

External links
PGA Media Guide 2012
PGA.com – 1962 PGA Championship

PGA Championship
Golf in Pennsylvania
PGA Championship
PGA Championship
PGA Championship
PGA Championship